is a Japanese badminton player who plays for The 77 Bank. She won her first international title at the Tahiti International tournament in the women's doubles event partnered with Ayaka Kawasaki. She and Kawasaki were the semi-finalists at the 2016 Belgian International tournament.

Personal life 
Her mother, Wu Jianqiu is a former member of the China national badminton team.

Achievements

BWF Grand Prix 
The BWF Grand Prix had two levels, the Grand Prix and Grand Prix Gold. It was a series of badminton tournaments sanctioned by the Badminton World Federation (BWF) and played between 2007 and 2017.

Women's doubles

Mixed doubles

  BWF Grand Prix Gold tournament
  BWF Grand Prix tournament

BWF International Challenge/Series 
Women doubles

  BWF International Challenge tournament
  BWF International Series tournament
  BWF Future Series tournament

References

External links 

 

1996 births
Living people
Sportspeople from Saitama Prefecture
Japanese female badminton players
21st-century Japanese women